Brenda Barratt (born 1946) is an English watercolour painter, particularly of architecture.

Born in Woodford Green, Barratt specialises in architectural subjects as well as gardens and landscapes. She works from her studio in Buxted, East Sussex. Brenda gets commissioned to capture the essence of various schools and colleges in England such as Hurstpierpoint College, Great Walstead School, Burgess Hill Girls School and Brighton College. She produces limited edition prints and donates the original to the school. Collectors from around the world have bought Brenda's architectural watercolors.

Barratt comes from a long line of professional artists and has been painting architectural subjects for over twenty years. Her father, Chris Rooke, was commissioned to paint watercolours of important buildings thought likely not to survive World War II. One of his paintings is in the custody of the Victoria and Albert Museum.

Barratt's painting on Space Shuttle
In May 2010 NASA astronaut Piers Sellers took an original watercolor portrait painted by Brenda Barratt into outer space aboard the Space Shuttle Atlantis flying its last mission, STS-132. Piers Sellers was a pupil at Cranbrook School, in Kent, and Brenda Barratt was asked by Angela Daly, the school's headteacher, to paint a watercolor of the school. The painting was then returned to Cranbrook School with the official NASA verification that it had travelled into space.

Schools where Brenda Barratt's paintings are displayed

 Adams' Grammar School, Newport, Shropshire, England
 Ardingly College, West Sussex, England
 Arnold School, Blackpool, Lancashire, England
 Brighton College, Brighton, England
 Broadwater School, Surrey, England
 Buckswood School, East Sussex, England
 Burgess Hill School, West Sussex, England
 Caterham School, Surrey, England
 Cranbrook School, Kent, England
 Great Walstead School,  Lindfield, West Sussex, England
 Handcross Park School, Haywards Heath, West Sussex, England
 Hawthorns School, Bletchingley, Surrey, England
 Hilden Grange School, Tonbridge, Kent, England
 Holmewood House School,  Kent, England
 Hurstpierpoint College, West Sussex, England
 Kent College, Kent, England
 Lewes Old Grammar School, Lewes, East Sussex, England
 Malvern St James College, Worcestershire, England.
 Moira House School, Eastbourne, England
 Old Swinford Hospital, Stourbridge, England
 Reigate Grammar School, Surrey, England
 Sexey's School, Bruton, Somerset, England
 The Skinners' School, Kent, England
 St Andrew’s School, Eastbourne, England
 St. Bartholomew's School, Berkshire, England
 St Joseph's Collegel, Reading, Berkshire,  England
 St Paul's School, London, England (architect: Alfred Waterhouse)
 St Swithun's School, Winchester, England
 Stoke Brunswick School, Ashurst Wood, West Sussex, England
 Tunbridge Wells Girls Grammar School, Kent, England
 Woldingham School, Surrey, England

References

External links
 Brenda Barratt's official website
 Brenda Barratt's House Portrait website
 Old Cranbrookians website
 Old Skinners' Society official website
 Caterham School official website -  news January 2010
 Lewes Old Grammar School website
 St. Bartholomew's School official  website - news 30.04.2009
 Burgess Hill School official website

English women painters
English watercolourists
Landscape artists
Living people
1946 births
People from Woodford, London
Date of birth missing (living people)
Women watercolorists
21st-century British women artists
People from Buxted
21st-century English women
21st-century English people